Inbred is the third extended play by American singer-songwriter Ethel Cain, released on April 23, 2021 through Daughters of Cain Records.

Recording and release
After releasing a handful of self-made EPs, Cain began collaborating with Lil Aaron. In February 2021, Cain released her first single under the new publishing contract, titled "Michelle Pfeiffer" featuring Lil Aaron. The song was premiered in Paper and featured on Billboard, The Fader, Nylon, and Pitchfork.

Reception
Arielle Gordon, writing for Pitchfork Media, gave this release a 7.6 out of 10, for adding "nuance and depth to both her sound and her character"; this album builds upon the mythology of the Ethel Cain pseudonym as well as adds new sounds to her musical repertorie.

Track listing
All songs written by Ethel Cain (credited as Hayden Silas Anhedönia), except where noted
"Michelle Pfeiffer" (Anhedönia and Lil Aaron) – 4:34
"Crush" – 3:27
"God's Country" (Anhedönia and Adam McIlwee) – 8:17
"Unpunishable" – 4:24
"Inbred" – 4:50
"Two-Headed Mother" – 6:14
Bonus tracks on CD release
"Crying During Sex" – 5:28
"Earnhardt" – 4:24
"Age of Delilah" (Demo) – 4:15
"Michelle Pfeiffer" (Solo Version) (Anhedönia and Lil Aaron) – 4:35

Personnel
Ethel Cain – vocals
Lil Aaron – rapping on "Michelle Pfieffer"
Wicca Phase Springs Eternal – vocals on "God's Country"

References

External links

2021 EPs
Ethel Cain albums
Concept albums